Qiasabad (also Romanized as Qīāsābād, Gheys̄ābād, and Ghīāsābād) is a village in Radkan Rural District, in the Central District of Chenaran County, Razavi Khorasan Province, Iran. At the 2006 census, its population was 1,190, in 298 families.

References 

Populated places in Chenaran County